Northeast Community School District is a rural public school district headquartered in Goose Lake, Iowa.

Located entirely in Clinton County, it serves Goose Lake, Andover, and Charlotte.

History
Northeast Community School District was formed in 1962, with the consolidation of Goose Lake, Elvira and Charlotte schools.

At one time the East Central Community School District had a whole grade-sharing agreement in which East Central sent students in grades 7–12 to the Northeast district. East Central residents had the option of instead attending Preston Community School District's secondary school in an open enrollment scheme, although most secondary students attended Northeast.

On July 1, 2013, East Central merged with the Preston district to form the Easton Valley Community School District. Northeast later sued the new Easton Valley district after that district stated that the grade-sharing agreement was no longer in place as Easton Valley was not the same district as the former East Central, and therefore had refused to pay Northeast related costs. The Northeast district began asking for compensation after the Iowa Supreme Court decided that the grade-sharing agreement was still in place; Northeast argued that the contract had been breached. In 2015 a settlement was reached involving Easton Valley paying Northeast $450,000.

Schools
The district operates two schools, both in rural Goose Lake:
 Northeast Elementary School
 Northeast Middle-High School

Northeast High School

Athletics
The Northeast Rebels compete in the River Valley Conference in the following sports:
Baseball
Bowling
Basketball
Cross Country 
Football
Golf 
Soccer 
Softball
Tennis (with Clinton)
Track and Field 
 Girls' 2003 Class 1A State Champions
Volleyball
Wrestling

See also
List of school districts in Iowa
List of high schools in Iowa

References

External links
 Northeast Community School District
  - Iowa Supreme Court

School districts in Iowa
Education in Clinton County, Iowa
School districts established in 1962
1962 establishments in Iowa